Cyanauges is a genus of flies in the family Stratiomyidae.

Species
Cyanauges fuscus (James, 1973)
Cyanauges maculatus (James, 1973)
Cyanauges ruficornis Schiner, 1868
Cyanauges valdivianus (Rondani, 1863)
Cyanauges villosus (Lindner, 1969)

References

Stratiomyidae
Brachycera genera
Taxa named by Camillo Rondani
Diptera of South America